Euthycaelus is a genus of tarantula. It was first described in 1889 by Simon, and is found through Central and South America.

Species 
, it contained 7 species:

 Euthycaelus amandae Guadanucci & Weinmann, 2014 - Colombia
 Euthycaelus astutus (Simon, 1889) - Venezuela
 Euthycaelus colonica Simon, 1889 - Venezuela
 Euthycaelus guane Valencia-Cuellar, Perafán & Guadanucci, 2019 - Colombia
 Euthycaelus janae Sherwood & Gabriel, 2022 - Peru
 Euthycaelus norae Guadanucci & Weinmann, 2014 - Colombia, Venezuela
 Euthycaelus quinteroi Gabriel & Sherwood, 2022 - Panama

References

Theraphosidae
Theraphosidae genera
Spiders of South America